Minuartia sintenisii, common name Troodos sandwort, is a dwarf annual, with few erect stems. Leaves linear-subulate, opposite. Sepals with a very narrow-hyaline margin. Petals up to 12 mm long, white, entire or slightly emarginate.

Distribution
It is an endemic of the summits of the Troodos Mountains in Cyprus. Flowers from April to June.

References

External links
 https://www.gbif.org/species/3811183 
 http://plants.jstor.org/specimen/k000742130
 http://www.theplantlist.org/tpl/record/kew-2369687
 http://ww2.bgbm.org/EuroPlusMed/PTaxonDetail.asp?NameId=101805&PTRefFk=7200000
 https://www.biodiversitylibrary.org/name/Minuartia_sintenisii

sintenisii
Endemic flora of Cyprus